The 1973–74 Quebec Nordiques season was the Nordiques second season, as they were coming off a 33–40–5 record, earning 71 points, failing to qualify for the playoffs in their first season.

The Nordiques would replace head coach Maurice Filion in the off-season, and name recently retired NHL superstar goaltender Jacques Plante as head coach of the team.  The club also acquired Serge Bernier from the Los Angeles Kings and Rejean Houle from the Montreal Canadiens of the NHL to try to spark the offense.

The Nordiques would improve and finish over .500 for the first time in team history with a 38–36–4 record, however, they would once again come up short for a playoff berth, finishing only 1 point behind the Chicago Cougars for the final spot.

Offensively, Quebec was led by Serge Bernier, as he would post a team best 86 points, scoring a Nordiques record 37 goals along the way.  Bob Guindon would have a very solid season, scoring 31 goals and 70 points, while Alain Coron would also score 31 goals while appearing in only 59 games due to injuries.  Defenseman J. C. Tremblay would anchor the defense, scoring 9 goals and earning 53 points, while Pierre Roy supplied the team toughness, recording 137 penalty minutes in only 44 games.

In goal, Richard Brodeur would lead the Nordiques in wins with 15 and save percentage at .901, while Michel DeGuise would post a team best 3.29 GAA, playing in a team high 32 games.  Serge Aubry also had some playing time, winning 11 games.

Season standings

Schedule and results

Season stats

Scoring leaders

Goaltending

Draft picks
Quebec's draft picks at the 1973 WHA Amateur Draft.

References

SHRP Sports
The Internet Hockey Database

Quebec Nordiques seasons
Que
Quebec